Chicago 21 may refer to 

 The album Twenty 1, by the band Chicago
 The Chicago 21 Plan, a 1970s urban renewal plan for the city of Chicago